Antonio Idiáquez Manrique (1579 – 17 November 1615) was a Roman Catholic prelate who served as Bishop of Segovia (1613–1615) and Bishop of Ciudad Rodrigo (1610–1613).

Biography
Antonio Idiáquez Manrique was born in 1579 in Madrid, Spain. On 26 May 1610, he was appointed during the papacy of Pope Paul V as Bishop of Ciudad Rodrigo. In 1610, he was consecrated bishop by Bernardo Sandoval Rojas, Archbishop of Toledo. On 4 February 1613, he was appointed during the papacy of Pope Paul V as Bishop of Segovia. He served as Bishop of Segovia until his death on 17 November 1615.

References

External links and additional sources
 (for Chronology of Bishops) 
 (for Chronology of Bishops) 
 (for Chronology of Bishops) 
 (for Chronology of Bishops) 

17th-century Roman Catholic bishops in Spain
Bishops appointed by Pope Paul V
1579 births
1615 deaths